Miguel Soler (born 6 June 1960) is a Spanish gymnast. He competed in seven events at the 1984 Summer Olympics.

References

1960 births
Living people
Spanish male artistic gymnasts
Olympic gymnasts of Spain
Gymnasts at the 1984 Summer Olympics
Gymnasts from Barcelona